Terrence Doody (born 1943) is an American literary scholar and Professor Emeritus at Rice University. He is known for his works on the novel.
He is a recipient of NEH and Mellon grants.

Books
 Confession and Community in the Novel
 Among Other Things: A Description of the Novel

References 

Living people
Rice University faculty
1943 births
American literary critics
Cornell University alumni